Arleta Jeziorska (born 1970) is a Mexican actress of films and telenovelas. She was born in Poland.

Telenovelas 
 La duda (2002) as Florenza
 Uroboros (2001) as Esposa
 Lo que es el amor (2001) asTere (Christian's biological mother)
 Demasiado corazón (1998) as Gisella
 El amor de tu vida S.A. (1996) as Dalias

Films 
 Nicolás (1994)
 Miroslava (1993) as Miroslava (young)

External links 
 

1970 births
Mexican film actresses
Mexican telenovela actresses
Polish emigrants to Mexico
Living people